Carl Hudson (born January 2, 1986) is a Canadian professional ice hockey player. He is currently playing with Polska Hokej Liga side GKS Katowice. Hudson was most recently signed to ETC Crimmitschau in the German DEL2.

Prior to turning professional, Hudson attended Canisius College where he played four seasons with the Canisius Golden Griffins men's ice hockey team which competes in NCAA's Division I in the Atlantic Hockey conference.

On July 9, 2010, Hudson was signed as a free agent by the Florida Panthers to an entry level contract.

Starting with the 2011–12 season, Hudson played two seasons in Germany with the ESV Kaufbeuren of the 2nd Bundesliga. He joined Pingouins de Morzine-Avoriaz of the French Ligue Magnus prior to the start of the 2013–14 season. He then played two seasons with the Cardiff Devils of the UK EIHL (2014–2015 & 2015–2016), before returning to France with Pionniers De Chamonix-Morzine in 2016.

In June 2017, Hudson returned to the UK to sign for Milton Keynes Lightning ahead of their inaugural season in the Elite Ice Hockey League.

After a season in Milton Keynes, Hudson returned to the German DEL2 to sign for ETC Crimmitschau in 2018.

In 2021, Hudson moved to Poland and signed for GKS Katowice for the 2021-22 season.

Awards and honours

References

External links

1986 births
Canadian ice hockey defencemen
Canisius Golden Griffins men's ice hockey players
Cardiff Devils players
Cincinnati Cyclones (ECHL) players
ETC Crimmitschau players
GKS Katowice (ice hockey) players
Ice hockey people from Ontario
Living people
Milton Keynes Lightning players
Rochester Americans players
Canadian expatriate ice hockey players in England
Canadian expatriate ice hockey players in Wales
Canadian expatriate ice hockey players in the United States
Canadian expatriate ice hockey players in Germany
Canadian expatriate ice hockey players in France
Canadian expatriate ice hockey players in Poland
Canadian sportspeople of Irish descent